Slobberbone is an American alt-country band from Denton, Texas, led by singer-songwriter Brent Best, Cody Garcia, Tony Harper, and Brian Lane. Best continues to tour as a solo act, performing both songs by Slobberbone and The Drams, and songs from his solo record, but also reunites with both bands for shows with full band line-ups.

History 
Slobberbone formed in early 1992 in Denton, Texas, where the band played for beer and had their first gig at the Park 'n' Go, a beer store in Denton. The best-known line-up consisted of singer-songwriter Brent Best on guitar and lead vocals, Jess Barr on lead guitar, Brian Lane on bass guitar, and drummer Tony Harper. The band members met after attending University of North Texas, where they lived in a house together and played local shows in Denton. Bassist Brian Lane joined the band in 1996 and guitarist Jess Barr in 1997. They eventually signed with the Austin-based record label, Doolittle Records (which eventually merged with New West Records). Their name is a reference to a dog's chew bone.

From 1995 onwards, Slobberbone as a band solidified its lineup and began playing shows outside of Texas, becoming known for its extensive touring schedule across the United States.

Jeff Cole from Doolittle Records produced the first two Slobberbone records. Jim Dickinson, who among other work is known for The Replacements, produced Everything You Thought Was Right Was Wrong Today, working with the band to record at Ardent Studios in Memphis, Tennessee.

Don Smith of Tommy Stinson's Bash & Pop and Cracker, produced Slippage in Los Angeles, California.

In early 2005, the band announced that it was calling it quits because Lane was moving to Florida. Slobberbone played a series of shows for their final farewell tour.

In 2009, the band (with the 2005 lineup) reunited for a series of shows. At the end of 2009, the reformed band, with Lane returned to Texas from Florida, announced that they plan on recording a new album in 2010 before going out on another tour. In May 2011, the band's drummer posted a blog entry stating that the planned mini-tour and merchandise sales would help provide the necessary funding for the band's long-anticipated album.

Outside of the United States, the band is popular in the Netherlands, where Slobberbone has toured intensively in the main clubs and on festivals since 1998.

The Drams 
In 2005, most of the band's members reformed as The Drams when Best was scheduled to play a full band show as a solo act. Two members from Denton, Texas' Budapest One, Keith Killoren and Chad Schlockslager, are members of The Drams. The Drams play rock with the inclusion of background vocals and keyboards. Their record, Jubilee Dive, was produced by Centro-Matic's Matt Pence and came out on mini-major New West Records.

Brent Best 
Best was born on September 1, 1970, in Austin, Texas, although his family moved to a nearby small town in Texas shortly after. When he was young he played in a band with his friend, singer-songwriter Kevin Kerby, from his teenage years onwards. They had a two-man band which they described as "Black Grass" that was called Sad Monkey Railroad. Best was able to co-write with Kerby, and produced the first self-released Slobberbone record with him.

In 2015, Best released a solo record called Your Dog, Champ on Last Chance Records. The record which began its start in April 2010, took 5 years to make and was crowd-funded. The record was well received. Grady Don Sandlin played drums and Ralph White (Bad Livers), Petra Kelly, Scott Danbom (Centro-Matic, Sarah Jaffe) and Claude Bernard (The Gourds) also contributed to the record.

Best contributed the song "Robert Cole" to the Bloodshot Records compilation, Just One More, A Musical Tribute to Larry Brown.

Recognition 
Stephen King mentioned the band's song "Gimme Back My Dog" in his novel Black House. He also listed the song as one of the top three greatest rock and roll songs ever in his column in Entertainment Weekly. Although never publicly confirmed, the album Slippage could very well be Slobberbone's nod to King. The word 'slippage' is an important term in Black House. King also mentions Slobberbone as a favorite of protagonist Richard Sifkitz in the novella Stationary Bike.

Drive-By Truckers front man Patterson Hood sang on the Slobberbone song "Lazy Guy" on Everything You Thought Was Right Was Wrong Today. Slobberbone often toured with the Drive-By Truckers early in both bands' careers.

Discography

Slobberbone 
 1994: Crow Pot Pie (self-released)
 1996: Crow Pot Pie (Doolittle); contains different songs than original
 1997: Limited Edition EP (Doolittle)
 1997: Barrel Chested (Doolittle / New West Records)
 1998: Your Excuse Live-EP (Doolittle / New West Records)
 2000: Everything You Thought Was Right Was Wrong Today (New West Records)
 2002: Slippage (New West Records)
 2016: Bees and Seas: The Best of Slobberbone (New West Records)

Compilations 
 1997: "Dark as a Dungeon" by Merle Travis on Straight Outta Boone County Cowboy Songs, Home Songs, Western Songs, Mountain Songs (Bloodshot Records)
 1999: "Scuffed" on Band-Kits: A Compilation of Denton, Texas Music (Quality Park)
 1999: "Piece of Crap" by Neil Young on This Note's for You Too! A Tribute to Neil Young (Interstate Records)
 2005: "Some New Town" by Bruce Springsteen on Thunder Road Tracks Inspired by the Boss (Uncut)
 2010: "Placemat Blues" on Suburban Home Records Mixtape 5: Someone's Gonna Die (Suburban Home)

The Drams 
 2006: Jubilee Dive (New West Records)

Brent Best 
 2015: Your Dog, Champ (Transient Camp Recordings for Last Chance Records)

References

Further reading 
 DeRemer, Leigh Ann. Contemporary Musicians. Profiles of the People in Music Volume 38. Detroit, Mich: Gale, 2003.   
 Gordon, Rev. Keith A. Rock Talk: On the Record with Rock Music's Most Interesting Talents. Franklin, TN: Anthem Pop/Kult Publishing, 2004.

External links 
 Slobberbone
 Brent Best at Last Chance Records
 
 

American alternative country groups
New West Records artists
Musical groups established in 1992
Musical groups from Denton, Texas